Andrew Stuart Hibberd  (5 September 1893 – 1 November 1983) was a British radio personality for 40 years. He is perhaps best known for his announcements of the death of King George V in 1936, and of Adolf Hitler in 1945.

Early life
Hibberd was the son of W.H. Hibberd, and was born in the town of Broadstone, in Wimborne, Dorset, in South West England, on 5 September 1893.

Education
Hibberd was educated at Queen Elizabeth's Grammar School in Wimborne Minster, followed by Weymouth College, an independent school for boys in the seaside town of Weymouth in Dorset in South West England. He then won a Choral Scholarship to St John's College at the University of Cambridge.

Life and career
Hibberd volunteered at the outbreak of the First World War in 1914, becoming an Army officer. He served with the Dorset Regiment at Gallipoli (in Turkey), and then in India, reaching the rank of captain.

Hibberd married Alice Mary Chichester in July 1923, and joined the BBC the following year, winning an MBE for his broadcasting in 1935. He was the chief announcer on BBC Radio until his retirement from the post in 1951, but continued to present BBC radio programmes until 1964.

Hibberd had a unique, immediately recognisable, voice. It could be described like someone whispering aloud. His voice was ideal for grave and solemn occasions and he is best remembered for his announcement of King George V's impending death on 20 January 1936 with the words: "The King's life is moving peacefully towards its close".

From 1949, Hibberd presented The Silver Lining, a Thursday afternoon programme aimed at disabled and housebound people. Hibberd retired as chief announcer in 1951, but continued to present The Silver Lining until it ended its run in 1964.

Hibberd was the subject of This Is Your Life in May 1957 when he was surprised by Eamonn Andrews at the King's Theatre, Hammersmith, London. He died on 1 November 1983, at the age of 90, and his funeral was held three days later, at St Peter's Church in Budleigh Salterton in Devon.

Bibliography

 "This - Is London . . . ", memoir by Hibberd (MacDonald and Evans, London, 1950)

References

1893 births
1983 deaths
Alumni of St John's College, Cambridge
British radio personalities
Radio and television announcers
Members of the Order of the British Empire
People educated at Weymouth College (public school)
British Army personnel of World War I
Dorset Regiment officers
Military personnel from Dorset
Burials in Devon